A.S. Fortis Spoleto F.C. was an Italian football club from Spoleto, Umbria. The club was founded in 2003, and won Serie D/E in 2005/06.

However, the club went out of existence after the team was excluded from playing Serie C2 in 2006–07 because of financial troubles and banned from all competitive football and has been replaced by current team Voluntas Spoleto currently playing in regional Eccellenza. They failed the national barrages  to gain promotion in Serie D losing with Jesina. A huge number of exclusions in Serie D will however allow Voluntas to be admitted in Serie D.

External links
 Excluded from professional football
 Promotion cancelled despite last minute appeal

Defunct football clubs in Italy
Association football clubs established in 2003
Association football clubs disestablished in 2006
2003 establishments in Italy
2006 disestablishments in Italy
Spoleto
Sport in Umbria